Tommy Paxton-Beesley (born 1990/1991), also known as River Tiber, is a Canadian singer, songwriter, multi-instrumentalist and record producer. He released his debut studio album Indigo in 2016. As a songwriter, Paxton-Beesley has frequently collaborated with producer Frank Dukes and artists including Kaytranada, Daniel Caesar, and BadBadNotGood. He has co-written the charting songs "No Tellin'" by Drake, "Broken Clocks" by SZA, "AstroThunder" by Travis Scott, and "I Keep Calling" by James Blake.

Background
Paxton-Beesley was born and raised in Toronto, Ontario. He also spent a year in Italy, where he lived near the Tiber River. Growing up, he took part in community music programs and attended the Claude Watson School for the Arts. He attended McGill University before graduating from the Berklee School of Music.

He released his debut EP The Star Falls in 2013, and followed up in 2015 with When the Time Is Right. A track from the latter EP, "No Talk", was sampled by producer Boi-1da for "No Tellin'", from the 2015 album If You're Reading This It's Too Late. Paxton-Beesley has also collaborated with BADBADNOTGOOD on their 2015 album Sour Soul, with Kaytranada on his Polaris Music Prize-winning 99.9%, and with Jazz Cartier on a track for Hotel Paranoia.

He released his debut full-length album Indigo in 2016. In 2017, he won a MuchMusic Video Award for "Acid Test", and the song was a shortlisted finalist for the SOCAN Songwriting Prize in 2017. During the end of the decade, he worked with Toronto artists Charlotte Day Wilson and Daniel Caesar.

On December 9, 2022, he released his sophomore record "Dreaming Eyes". The album release was accompanied by a music video for the acclaimed track "Hypnotized" which was conceptualized and directed by Leo Aguirre.  “Hypnotized” was also featured on Kendrick Lamar’s Grammy Award-nominated album Mr. Morale & the Big Steppers.

Personal life
He is the brother of actress Alex Paxton-Beesley.

Discography

Studio albums
From Now On (2011)
Synapses (2013)
Indigo (2016)
Dreaming Eyes (2022)

Extended plays
The Star Falls (2013)
When the Time Is Right (2015)

Singles 

 "Prophets" (2014)
 "West" with Daniel Caesar from Indigo (2016)
 "Illusions" (feat. Pusha T) / "Gravity" (2016)
 "Acid Test" from Indigo (2016)
 "Patience" (2017)
 "Deep End" (2018)
 "Taurus" (2019)
 "Nevada" (2019)
 "Rainbow Road" / "Hypnotized" (2020)
 "Sent from Above" (2021)

As featured artist 

Kaytranada – "Bus Ride" and "Vivid Dreams" (feat. River Tiber) – from 99.9% (2015)
Selena Gomez – "Kill Em With Kindness - River Tiber Remix" single (2016)
 Jazz Cartier – "Tell Me" (feat. River Tiber) from Hotel Paranoia (2016); also producer
Junia-T – "Tommy's Intro" (feat. River Tiber & Sean Leon) from Studio Monk (2020)

Songwriting credits 
 indicates a featured artist contribution.

 indicates an additional/co-producer contribution.

 indicates a background vocal contribution.

Other credits 
Albums
 Justin Nozuka – Ulysees (2014); musician
BadBadNotGood – III (2014); guitar, violin, cello
 BadBadNotGood & Ghostface Killah – Sour Soul (2015); cello, violin, trombone, guitar, organ
 Tess Parks – Blood Hot (2015); co-producer, drums, guitar, bass, tambourine, cello
 Kingsway Music Library – Colors (2015); musician
Tracks
Daniel Caesar – "Death & Taxes" from Pilgrim's Paradise (2015); music
Sean Leon – "This Ain't 2012" single (2015); additional vocals
Freddie Gibbs – "Insecurities" from Shadow of a Doubt (2015); additional vocals
Daniel Caesar – "Won't Live Here" single (2016); music
 Charlotte Day Wilson – "Where Do You Go" from CDW (2016); producer, bass, cello, violin, synth
Post Malone – "Cold" from Stoney (2016); background vocals
 Charlotte Day Wilson – "Let You Down" & "Falling Apart" from Stone Woman (2018); strings, synth, vocals, drums
Kaytranda – "Freefall" from Bubba (2019); synth

Awards and nominations

References 

Canadian rhythm and blues musicians
Musicians from Toronto
Berklee College of Music alumni
Living people
21st-century Canadian male musicians
Year of birth missing (living people)